Transliminality (literally, "going beyond the threshold") was a concept introduced by  the parapsychologist Michael Thalbourne, an Australian psychologist who was based at the University of Adelaide. It is defined as a hypersensitivity to psychological material (imagery, ideation, affect, and perception) originating in (a) the unconscious, and/or (b) the external environment (Thalbourne & Maltby, 2008). High degrees of this trait have been shown by Thalbourne to be associated with increased tendency to mystical experience, greater creativity, and greater belief in the paranormal, but Thalbourne has also found evidence that transliminality may be positively correlated with psychoticism. He has published articles on transliminality in journals on parapsychology and psychology.

Measurement and correlates
The original transliminality scale had 29 items. A revised version with 17 items was developed to eliminate bias associated with age and gender differences. The revised version of the transliminality scale includes items assessing magical ideation, mystical experience, absorption, hyperaesthesia, manic experience, dream interpretation, and fantasy proneness.

Dreaming
The revised scale was found to be positively correlated with seven types of dream experiences:  
 lucid dreams
 archetypal dreams - dreams "carrying a sense of awe and fascination and/or encounters with strange and unusual beings"
 fantastic nightmares - upsetting and very vivid memorable dreams, involving a range of negative emotions
 prelucid dreams - where one questions whether one is dreaming but cannot decide
 control dreams - control not possible in waking life is exercised in the dream
 posttraumatic nightmares - a traumatic real event is relived
 night terrors - awakening in terror with no recall of dream content

Personality
Transliminality is positively correlated with openness to experience and negatively correlated with tough-mindedness and self-control from the 16PF Questionnaire. Some of the item content assesses absorption and the scale is therefore correlated with the Tellegen Absorption Scale. Transliminality is conceptually similar to Ernest Hartmann's concept of "boundaries of the mind" and accordingly is correlated with the Boundary Questionnaire.

See also 
 Schizotypy
 Self-transcendence

References

Further reading
 Lange, R., Thalbourne, M.A., Houran, J., & Storm, L. (2000). The Revised Transliminality Scale: Reliability and Validity Data From a Rasch Top-Down Purification Procedure. Consciousness and Cognition, 9,  591-617
 Thalbourne, M.A., Bartemucci, L., Delin, P.S., Fox, B. & Nofi, O. (1997). Transliminality: Its Nature and Correlates. Journal of the American Society for Psychical Research, 91,  305-332
 Thalbourne, M.A. & Delin,  P.S. (1994) A  common thread underlying belief in the paranormal, mystical experience and psychopathology Journal of Parapsychology,  58, 3-38
 Thalbourne, M.A. & Delin,  P.S. (1999). Transliminality: Its Relation to Dream Life, Religiosity and Mystical Experience. The International Journal for the Psychology of Religion, 9, 45-61
 Thalbourne, M.A. & Houran, J. (2005). Patterns of Self-Reported Happiness and Substance Use in the Context of Transliminality. Personality and Individual Differences, 38, 327-336
 Thalbourne, M.A. & Maltby, J. (2008).Transliminality, thin boundaries, Unusual Experiences, and temporal lobe lability. Personality and Individual Differences, 44, 1617–1623.

Parapsychology
Dream
Personality traits